Ciumac is a surname. Notable people with the surname include: 

Andrei Ciumac (born 1985), Moldovan tennis player
Dumitru Ciumac (born 1981), Moldovan footballer 

Romanian-language surnames